University of Canberra Senior Secondary College Lake Ginninderra, formerly known as Lake Ginninderra College until 2011, is a public secondary college for students in Years 11 and 12. It is located in the Australian Capital Territory, Australia, situated on the lakefront of Lake Ginninderra.

History
Lake Ginninderra College was established in 1987, with John Cope being appointed as founding Principal. University of Canberra Senior Secondary College Lake Ginninderra is located near its partner facilities the University of Canberra and the Australian Institute of Sport.

Australian Institute of Sport Program
University of Canberra Senior Secondary College Lake Ginninderra is the designated college for students in Years 11 and 12 attending the Australian Institute of Sport (AIS), consistent with a Memorandum of Understanding between the Australian Sports Commission and the ACT Government. The college has supported AIS students with a range of programs to enable completion of their secondary education while training at the institute. The list of sporting graduates includes: Shane Heal, Lauren Jackson, Petria Thomas, Mark Viduka, Todd Woodbridge, Andrew Bogut, LIz Cambage, Daniel Azarni, Joe Ingles, Dante Exum and many more.

Campus
The college is located in Belconnen, Canberra. Following its completion in 1987, the unique architecture of the campus gained local recognition, and was awarded the ACT Architecture Merit Award. Daryl Jackson, an internationally renowned Australian architect, also featured the college in an article in which he discussed several of his personal favourite school designs, the thinking, underpinning the designs and what makes them work effectively.

Curriculum

Year 12 Certification and Tertiary Entrance
The college offers students over eighty courses of study for the award of the ACT Year 12 Certificate, with students who complete a T (Tertiary) Package able to sit the ACT Scaling Test (AST) to obtain an Australian Tertiary Admission Rank (ATAR) for admission to university.

Vocational Education and Training courses
The college offers a large range of Vocational Education and Training courses (VET) programs. A high percentage of students who graduate with a Year 12 Certificate also receive at least one VET qualification.

Notable students and alumni

 Mustafa Amini - footballer
 David Andersen - basketball player
 Andrew Barr - politician
 Suzy Batkovic - basketball player
 Abby Bishop - basketball player
 Andrew Bogut - former professional basketball player
 Dante Exum - basketball player
 Lexie Feeney - archer
 Shane Heal - basketball player
 Belinda Hocking - backstroke swimmer
 Joe Ingles - basketball player for the Milwaukee Bucks
 Lauren Jackson - basketball player
 Rachel Jarry - basketball player
 Damian Martin - basketball player
 Patty Mills - basketball player for the Brooklyn Nets
 Cameron Myers - athlete
 Brad Newley - basketball player
 Luke Schenscher - basketball player
 Belinda Snell - basketball player
 Jane Waller - archer
 Taylor Worth - archer
 Emily Van Egmond- soccer player 
 Hugh Greenwood- Basketball player/AFL Footballer
 Tom Wilson (basketball)
 Kye Rowles - soccer player
 Josh Giddey- basketball player for the Oklahoma City Thunder
 Chima Moneke - basketball player for the Sacramento Kings

See also
 List of schools in the Australian Capital Territory
 Global Classroom Conference, hosted by the college in 2017

References

1987 establishments in Australia
Educational institutions established in 1987
High schools in the Australian Capital Territory